Argentinoeme is a genus of beetles in the family Cerambycidae, containing the following species:

 Argentinoeme pseudobscura Di Iorio, 1995
 Argentinoeme schulzi Bruch, 1911

References

Xystrocerini